The Daily Mail Circuit of Britain air race was a British cross-country air race which took place from 1911 until 1914,  with prizes donated by the Daily Mail newspaper on the initiative of its proprietor, Lord Northcliffe. It was one of several races and awards offered by the paper between 1906 and 1925.

The 1911 race took place on 22 July and was a  event with 11 compulsory stops and a circular route starting and finishing at Brooklands in Surrey.
The runner up was Jules Védrines in a Morane-Borel monoplane  with James Valentine, in a Deperdussin, third.

The 1913 race was for British seaplanes and had a first prize of £5,000.  Only one aircraft started the course; it was damaged when landing near Dublin, and did not complete the course.

The 1914 race, also offering a prize of £5,000, was to have been held between 1 and 15 August. It was cancelled due to the outbreak of the First World War.

1911 competition

The 1911 Daily Mail Circuit of Britain was a contest for the fastest completion of a course around Great Britain. The proprietors of the Daily Mail offered a £10,000 prize to any aviator to complete an approximately 1,000 miles circuit of Britain in the shortest time. The contest was run by the Royal Aero Club and was held between 22 July 1911 and 5 August 1911.  Following the success of the £10,000 competition for the 1910 London to Manchester air race, the editor announced that a further £10,000 prize would be awarded, it would either be between London and Edinburgh and return or London and Paris and return.

It was decided that the competition would be a tour round Great Britain and a committee of the Royal Aero Club was formed to set the rules and organize the competition on behalf of the Daily Mail. For an entrance fee of £100 the event was open to all licensed aviators, and as well as the Daily Mail prize a number of smaller prizes were also offered. The circuit was to start and finish at Brooklands, and the competitors had to land  at Hendon, Harrogate, Newcastle, Edinburgh, Stirling, Glasgow, Carlisle, Manchester, Bristol, Exeter, Salisbury and Brighton. Four competitors completed the course, the first and winner of the prize was the Frenchman Lieut Jean Louis Conneau, flying under the name of André Beaumont.

Competitors

Stage 1 Brooklands to Hendon
The race began at Brooklands on 22 July 1911 with a short 20 mile section to Hendon Aerodrome, only 21 of the 30 competitors started and 19 headed for Hendon of which 17 arrived.

Stage 2 Hendon to Edinburgh
The competitors started to depart on the second stage on 24 July 1911 for the 343 miles from Hendon to Edinburgh with two compulsory stops:
Hendon to Harrogate 182 miles - five made it to Harrogate
Harrogate to Newcastle 68 miles
Newcastle to Edinburgh 92 miles - the same five later reached Edinburgh

Stage 3 Edinburgh to Bristol

Total distance 383 miles with stops at Stirling, Glasgow, Carlisle, and Manchester.
Edinburgh to Stirling 31 miles
Stirling to Glasgow 22 miles
Glasgow to Carlisle 86 miles
Carlisle to Manchester 103 miles
Manchester to Bristol 141 miles
Five started from Edinburgh but only four made it to Bristol, they were all to complete the contest.

Stage 4 Bristol to Brighton
Total distance 224 miles with stops at Exeter, Salisbury Plain.
Bristol to Exeter 65 miles
Exeter to Salisbury Plain 83 miles
Salisbury Plain to Brighton 76 miles

Stage 5 Brighton to Brooklands
All competitors had to complete the last 40 miles to Brooklands before 19:30 on 5 August 1911. Beaumont was the first to arrive back on 26 July 1911 - 1 hour 10 minutes before his fellow Frenchman Jules Vedrines - he had travelled 1,010 miles in 22 hours 28 min 18 sec.  Valentine, arrived back on 4 August 1911 followed the next day by Cody who was the fourth and the last to arrive at Brooklands on 5 August 1911.

Prizes
Conneau won the £10,000 prize for the first to complete the circuit. He also won the Entente Cordiale prize of 50 guineas (£52.50) from the proprietors of Perrier table water for the first Frenchman to complete the course.
Vedrine, Valentine and Cody all equal shares of prizes from Sir George White, the chairman of the British and Colonial Aeroplane Company (£250 total) and the British Petroleum Company Limited (125 guineas total or £43.75 each) for finishing the course.
Cody won a £50 prize from the Northumberland and Durham Aero Club for the first British machine to arrive in Newcastle.
Valentine received a £50 tea service from the Harrogate Chamber of Trade for the first British aviator to reach Harrogate and a 100 guinea gold cup from the Brighton Hotels Association for the first British aviator to reach Brighton. He also won the Entente Cordiale prize of 50 guineas (£52.50) from the proprietors of Perrier table water for the first Englishman to complete the course.

1913 competition
The 1913 race, offering  prize of £5,000, was for floatplanes, which had to be of all-British construction. The course, totalling  had to be completed within 72 hours, although since no flying was allowed on Sundays this period was in practice a day longer.  
 
The race was divided into the following stages:
Southampton to Ramsgate — 
Ramsgate to Yarmouth — 
Yarmouth to Scarborough — 
Scarborough to Aberdeen — 
Aberdeen to Cromarty — 
Cromarty to Oban — 
Oban to Dublin — 
Dublin to Falmouth — 
Falmouth to Southampton — 

Entrants included the Cody Waterplane, the Radley-England Waterplane and the Sopwith Circuit of Britain floatplane.
Cody was killed during a test flight of his design on 7 August when his aircraft broke up in flight, and the Sopwith, flown by Harry Hawker with Harry Kauper as passenger, was the only aircraft to start; it retired after being damaged in an emergency landing near Dublin having completed about two-thirds of the course. Hawker was given a prize of £1,000 for his effort.

References
Notes

Bibliography

External links
 Daily Mail Circuit of Britain Air Race Film of aircraft taking off from Brooklands 22 July 1911, including John Cyril Porte's accident and other scenes from Hendon Aerodrome 
Map of 1913 route published in Flight(Wayback)
Whipton, a stopping point for contestants in the 1911 contest

Air races
Aviation history of the United Kingdom
1911 in aviation
Daily Mail
1910s in the United Kingdom
1911 in the United Kingdom
1913 in aviation
1913 in the United Kingdom
Events cancelled due to World War I